Farrenkopf may refer to:

 Farrenkopf, a mountain in the Central Black Forest near Hausach in the Kinzig valley
 Michael Farrenkopf (born 1966), German historian